Cheney Bluff is a steep rock bluff at the south side of the mouth of Carlyon Glacier,  southwest of Cape Murray. It was mapped by the United States Geological Survey from tellurometer surveys and Navy air photos, 1959–63, and named by the Advisory Committee on Antarctic Names for Lieutenant Commander D.J. Cheney, Royal New Zealand Navy, commander of HMNZS Rotoiti on ocean station duty between Christchurch and McMurdo Sound,  1963–64.

References 

Cliffs of Oates Land